Túrós csusza is a traditional Hungarian savoury curd cheese noodle dish made with small home-made noodles or pasta.

Traditionally, noodles used for this dish are home-made with flour and eggs, mixed into a dough, and torn by hand into uneven fingernail-sized pieces that are then boiled in water. Spaghetti, fusilli or large egg macaroni bows can also be used instead of the home-made noodles.

The noodles are cooked in salt water and drained, crumbled cheese (túró), chopped, fried, crispy bacon, topped with thick Hungarian sour cream (tejföl) and lightly salted.  The mixture is then heated in the oven for a few minutes before serving.

Other Hungarian pasta dishes

Savoury

Cabbage squares
Cabbage squares or cabbage and noodles is a savoury Hungarian pasta dish.

Macaroni bows or home-made thin pasta squares (like tiny lasagne) are boiled in salted water, drained, and mixed with some cooking oil or fat. The finely grated cabbage is slowly sautéed in a bowl with oil or fat, with salt, freshly ground black pepper and a pinch of sugar, until it becomes golden brown. The cabbage is then mixed into the hot pasta and served.

Sweet

Walnut pasta
Layers of pasta, jam and ground walnuts mixed with sugar, finished with noodles, are placed into a greased pan. The dish is heated in the oven for a short while and served hot.

Poppy seed pasta
Boil noodles in salted water. Sugar and ground poppy seeds are mixed and sprinkled on the hot noodles and served. This dish is also a Polish meal and a Polish Christmas dish.

See also

 List of pasta dishes

References

Pasta dishes
Noodle dishes
Bacon dishes
Cheese dishes
Hungarian cuisine
Baked foods